No Exit is a 2022 American thriller film directed by Damien Power from a screenplay by Andrew Barrer and Gabriel Ferrari, based on the 2017 novel of the same name by Taylor Adams. It stars Havana Rose Liu as a recovering drug addict who discovers a kidnapping in progress while stranded at a rest stop during a blizzard. Danny Ramirez, David Rysdahl, Dale Dickey, and Dennis Haysbert co-star as the four suspects while Mila Harris plays the victim. No Exit was released on February 25, 2022, on Hulu by 20th Century Studios. It received mixed reviews from critics, who categorized it as a "reasonably diverting" .

Plot
Recovering addict Darby Thorne learns that her mother is in the hospital after suffering a brain aneurysm, and is undergoing emergency surgery. She escapes rehab and drives to Salt Lake City. While stopped in the middle of the road, Corporal Ron Hill tells her that the interstate is closed because of a developing blizzard. She agrees to stay overnight at a local visitor's center. The only people inside are Ash, Lars, and married couple Ed and Sandi. Darby goes outside to look for cellphone signal and ends up discovering a kidnapped girl in a van belonging to one of the people inside.

Playing a round of Bullshit, Darby uses her knowledge of the van's license plate to question the others and deduce that Lars is the kidnapper. She goes to the bathroom and uses a hole in the wall to go back outside. Darby breaks into the van and talks to the girl, promising to save her. Unaware of her presence, Lars enters the van and reveals the girl's name to be Jay. Inside, Ed grows suspicious of Lars's strange behavior. As Lars exits the van to bring Jay some food, Darby goes back inside the cabin through the hole in the wall.

Jay has Addison's disease, which can cause an adrenaline overdose if she becomes too stressed. In the bathroom, Darby tells Ash about Jay. Ash agrees to help her. When Darby goes outside, however, Ash reveals that he is Lars's brother and an accomplice in the kidnapping. Ash takes Darby back inside and threatens to kill her if she informs Ed and Sandi about Jay. Outside, Jay cuts herself free and runs into the woods. In the bathroom, Darby attacks Ash, but he gains the upper hand. Lars goes through the hole in the wall and stops his brother from strangling Darby. In the struggle, Darby takes Ash's keys.

Ash and Lars force Darby to help them look for Jay. They reveal that they are transporting her to their Uncle Kenny, who runs a human trafficking ring. Darby uses a flashlight to blind the kidnappers and runs away. Ash fires his firearm, alerting Ed and Sandi. Ed and Sandi find Jay unconscious in the snow. Darby goes inside the cabin and tells Ed and Sandi about the kidnappers. After locking the entrance, Ed negotiates with Ash and Lars. He promises to give them the car keys if they give Jay the medicine she needs to survive. As Darby hides the keys, Ash and Lars cover the cabin in gasoline. Jay wakes up and identifies Sandi as her maid. A flashback reveals that Sandi helped Ash and Lars take Jay from her home. She agreed to meet with the kidnappers to give them Jay's medicine. In the present, Sandi lets Ash and Lars inside.

After learning that Darby is the only person who knows where the keys are, Ash kills Ed and Sandi and uses a nail gun to staple Darby to a wall. Her phone receives a text message; Ash reads it and informs her that her mother has died. Another text reveals that Corporal Ron is on his way to the cabin. When Ash threatens to hurt Jay, Darby reveals the key's whereabouts. Ash gives his gun to Lars before leaving to search for the keys. Darby tells Jay to turn off the lights.

Darby snorts heroin to numb the pain receptors to pull the nail out of her hand. With Lars distracted, she takes his gun as Ash returns. During a standoff with Darby holding Lars hostage, Jay hits Ash's nailgun with a hammer, thus shooting a nail in Lars' forehead. Darby and Jay run outside to make their escape. Ash punctures their vehicle and sets the cabin on fire. After Corporal Ron arrives, Darby shoots Ash while Ron shoots Darby. Ash takes her weapon and shoots Ron dead. As he prepares to kill Darby, she uses a screwdriver to puncture his neck, killing him. Darby uses Ron's radio to call for help. In a flash-forward, Darby's sister Devon visits her in rehab.

Cast
 Havana Rose Liu as Darby Thorne
 Danny Ramirez as Ash, one of the suspects
 David Rysdahl as Lars, one of the suspects
 Dale Dickey as Sandi, a suspect and Ed's wife
 Mila Harris as Jay, the kidnapped girl
 Dennis Haysbert as Ed, a Marine  and Sandi's husband
 Benedict Wall as Corporal Ron Hill
 Lisa Zhang as Devon, Darby's sister
 Hweiling Ow as Darby's mother

Production
On October 10, 2017, it was announced that 20th Century Fox had optioned the feature rights to the 2017 novel by Taylor Adams. Logan writer Scott Frank was attached to develop and produce the film adaptation. By March 12, 2019, Damien Power had signed on to direct the film, with Ant-Mans Andrew Barrer and Gabriel Ferrari adapting the screenplay. On June 29, 2021, Danny Ramirez, Dennis Haysbert, Havana Rose Liu, David Rysdahl, Dale Dickey, and Mila Harris were confirmed to star and it was announced that production had wrapped in New Zealand. During post-production, Marco Beltrami and Miles Hankins composed the score.

Release
Initially intended for a theatrical release by 20th Century Studios, the film was instead distributed by Hulu in the United States and released on February 25, 2022. It was released on Disney+ in international markets and Star+ in Latin America on the same date. The film will be released on Disney+ Hotstar in Southeast Asia as well as India on a later date.

Reception

Audience viewership 
According to Whip Media, No Exit was the 6th most streamed movie across all platforms, in the United States, during the week of February 25, 2022 to February 27, 2022, and the 9th during the week of March 4, 2022 to March 6, 2022.

Critical response 
 

Frank Sheck of The Hollywood Reporter found that Damien Power skillfully manages to capture the plot mechanics through his direction, and complimented the performances of the actors, especially Liu's as a lead character. Jeff Ewing of Forbes praised the pace of the film and the performances of the actors, although stating that the film provides characters that are under-written, which creates a lack of emotional weight. Lena Wilson of TheWrap complimented the diversity of the cast, and found the idea of a drug addict as a hero portrayed by an Asian actress original, but criticized the script that provides overused plot twists which diminishes their impact. Ross Bonaime of Collider gave the movie a C rating, complimenting the story and its suspense, while criticizing the inconstant level of violence and the development of Havana Rose's character. Hoai-Ttran Bui of /Film rated the film 6.5 out of 10 and praised the performances of the actors, especially Liu's, and the direction that manages to create a threatening set, but found the characterization of the characters disheartening. Brian Tallerico of RogerEbert.com rated the movie a 2.5 out of 4 stars and found the performance of the whole cast convincing, but found the movie forgettable due to its lack of strong dialogues and stressful setting. Beatrice Loayza of The New York Times found Power's direction not sufficiently good enough to capture the tension of the movie, while claiming that the script carries out the plot with no effort, preventing the film to provide a real tension as a thriller.

References

External links
 Official website
 

2022 thriller films
20th Century Studios films
American thriller films
Films about death
Films about kidnapping in the United States
Films based on American thriller novels
Films produced by Scott Frank
Films scored by Marco Beltrami
Films set in Utah
Films shot in New Zealand
Hulu original films
2020s English-language films
2020s American films